F(l)ag Football is a 2015 American documentary film on the National 🏳️‍🌈 Flag Football League directed by Seth Greenleaf. It documents the training of players on the NGFFL's New York Warriors team as they prepare for the 🏳️‍🌈 Bowl. The documentary explores masculinity in sports. The documentary stars, Wade Davis, team captain of the New York Warriors, Cyd Zeigler, co-founder of the NGFFL, Brenton Metzler, and Jared Garduno.

See also

 Homosexuality in modern sports
 List of LGBT-related films of 2015

References

External links 

2015 short documentary films
American short documentary films
Documentary films about American football
Documentary films about LGBT sportspeople
2015 LGBT-related films
American LGBT-related short films
2010s English-language films
2010s American films